KAPN may refer to:

 Kommunistische Arbeiders-Partij Nederland, council communist party in the Netherlands
 The ICAO code for Alpena County Regional Airport in Alpena, Michigan, United States
 KAPN (FM), a radio station (107.3 FM) licensed to Caldwell, Texas, United States